Trocadéro is a station on Line 6 and Line 9 of the Paris Métro in the 16th arrondissement. It serves and is named after the Place du Trocadéro.

History
The station opened on 2 October 1900 as a branch of Line 1 from Étoile to Trocadéro. On 5 November 1903, the line was extended to Passy; the line from Étoile to Trocadéro and Passy became known as Line 2 South as part of a planned ring line around central Paris to be built under or over the boulevards built in place of the demolished Wall of the Farmers-General; this circle is now operated as two lines: 2 and 6. On 14 October 1907, the line from Étoile to Trocadéro, Place d'Italie and Gare du Nord became part of line 5. On 6 October 1942 the section of line 5 from Étoile to Trocadéro and Place d'Italie was transferred to Line 6. The Line 9 platforms opened on 8 November 1922 as part of the first section of the line from Trocadéro to Exelmans.

The Place de Trocadéro owes its name to the fortified position in Puerto Real, on the Bay of Cadiz in the south of Spain, which was captured in the Battle of Trocadero by French troops led by Louis-Antoine, Duke of Angoulême, Charles X's son in 1823. This name was also given to the "Moorish" palace built for the World Fair of 1878. The palace was demolished in 1937 and was replaced by the current Palace of Chaillot.

The station is near the Barrière Sainte-Marie, a gate built for the collection of taxation as part of the Wall of the Farmers-General; the gate was built between 1784 and 1788 and demolished in 1830.

Places of interest
The Palace of Chaillot accommodates:
the Musée national de la Marine (maritime museum);
the Musée national des Monuments Français (museum of monuments); and
the Théâtre national de Chaillot.
the Cité de l'Architecture et du Patrimoine (architecture museum)

The Eiffel Tower and the Passy Cemetery are nearby as well as the Musée du quai Branly – Jacques Chirac, which now houses many of the objects once exhibited at the Trocadéro ethnographic museum (Musée de l'Homme);

Station layout

Gallery

References

Paris Métro stations in the 16th arrondissement of Paris
Railway stations in France opened in 1901
Articles containing video clips